Maaya is a 1972 Indian Malayalam-language film, directed by Ramu Kariat for Jaya Maruthi, starring Thikkurissy Sukumaran Nair in the lead role. Prem Nazir and Sharada also play pivotal roles, supported by Vijayasree, Sujatha, Sankaradi and T. R. Omana playing other important roles. The film was based on an award-winning 1963 novel with the same name by popular novelist K. Surendran.

Plot
Sankarappillai (Thikkurissy Sukumaran Nair) is a local businessman who runs a grocery shop in the village centre. He also owns the little textile shop of the village which his son Raghuvaran Pillai (Adoor Bhasi) operates. Sankarappillai's family also includes his second wife Eeswari (T. R. Omana) and daughter Gomathy (Sharada). Sankarappillai is separated from his first wife Kalyani (Adoor Bhavani), but visits and supports his daughter Omana in the first marriage.

Gomathy is in love with Madhavankutty (Prem Nazir) an educated, but unemployed young man. Sankarappillai and Eeswary also encourages their relation. Madhavankutty  takes up a job in a newspaper in the town. Raghu wishes to expand the textile business, Madhavankutty introduces Raghu and Sankarappillai to his old classmate Vasukkutty (K. P. Ummer). Vasukkutty's uncle Pankippillai (GK Pillai) run a bigger textile shop in the town. Though the two head-strong men clash at first, Pankippillai agrees to loan textiles worth Rs 30,000 to Sankarappillai. Vasukkutty  meets Gomathy during a business visit to Sankarappillai's home and falls head over heels for the beautiful girl. Seeking a business advantage, Sankarappillai decides to arrange Gomathy's wedding with Vasukkutty, leaving a heartbroken Madhavankutty to writing.

Sankarappillai's calculations fail when Pankippillai  refuses to honour the loan arrangement even after the wedding. In the meantime, a relation slowly develops between Madhavankutty and Omana. Raghu falls in love with Vasukkutty's sister Kamalam (Vijayasree). Gomathy and Vasukkutty visit Sankarapillai with this proposal. Sankarappillai agrees with the condition of Rs 10,000 as dowry from  Pankippillai. During the wedding arrangements, Sankarappillai visits Pankippillai and demands the dowry beforehand. This angers Pankippillai, who refuses to give the money. This cancels the wedding and angers Vasukkutty.

The rest of the story is Sankarappillai's fall, clashing with his own family.

Cast 
Thikkurissy Sukumaran Nair as Sankarappillai 
Prem Nazir as Madhavankutty
Sharada as Gomathy
K. P. Ummer as Vasukkutty 
Adoor Bhasi as Raghuvaran Pillai a.k.a. Raghu
Vijayasree as Kamalam 
Sujatha as Omana 
Sankaradi as Veluppillai 
T. R. Omana as Eeswari  
Paul Vengola as Anthony 
Muthukulam Raghavan Pilla as Beedi Maker 
Adoor Bhavani as Kalyani 
G. K. Pillai as Pankippillai 
Paravoor Bharathan as Mute 
Sadhana 
Thodupuzha Radhakrishnan as Kumaran
 Muthukulam
 Baby Lakshmi

Songs

This film has popular songs written by Sreekumaran Thampi and composed by V. Dakshinamoorthy.

References

External links
 

1972 films
1970s Malayalam-language films
Films based on Indian novels
Films directed by Ramu Kariat